Toyga ( or ) is a national meal of Turkish cuisine. It is a yogurt soup cooked with a variety of herbs (mentha and others), wheat and (sometimes) chickpeas.

See also
Ash-e doogh, a similar Iranian dish
Dovga, a similar Azerbaijani dish
 List of soups
 List of yogurt-based dishes and beverages

References

Azerbaijani soups
Turkish soups
Wheat dishes